Maple Ridge-Pitt Meadows is a provincial electoral district for the Legislative Assembly of British Columbia, Canada.  The 2008 re-distribution is an amalgamation of the old Maple Ridge-Pitt Meadows riding with an addition of a small portion of the old Maple Ridge-Mission.

Demographics

Geography

1999 redistribution
Changes from Maple Ridge-Pitt Meadows to Maple Ridge-Pitt Meadows include:
Removal of the majority of land in the District of Maple Ridge
Removal of Douglas Island

History 
The riding was created for the 1991 election from part of the dual-member Dewdney riding.

Members of the Legislative Assembly

Election results 

Pratas campaigned with the BC Conservative Party but was listed as "No affiliation" on the ballot.

References

External links 
BC Stats - 2001 (pdf)
Results of 2001 election (pdf)
2001 Expenditures (pdf)
Results of 1996 election
1996 Expenditures (pdf)
Results of 1991 election
1991 Expenditures
Website of the Legislative Assembly of British Columbia

British Columbia provincial electoral districts
Maple Ridge, British Columbia
Pitt Meadows
Provincial electoral districts in Greater Vancouver and the Fraser Valley